The Jump & Smile is a type of fairground ride in which the chair cars are arranged on a number of radial arms around a central axis. As the central axis rotates, the arms are lifted into the air at pseudo-random intervals giving an erratic jumping motion.
There is another version called Techno Jump, which had a specific pattern in which the cars would go up, one at a time, and then shake a little when up. Then the ride would suddenly drop up and down in order, creating the illusion of moving waves and the sound of pistons going "ch-ch-ch-ch-ch-ch". Also this ride would freeze in midair, making riders think it was over before starting to do the same jumping motion backwards. This ride is popular for most ages.

References

Amusement rides